The 2018 JLT Community Series was the Australian Football League (AFL) pre-season competition played before the 2018 home and away season. It featured 18 matches across 16 days, reducing each team's games played from three to two, seemingly to create space for AFLX events. For the fifth year in a row, the competition did not have a grand final or overall winner. 2018 was also the first pre-season competition played without the nine-point super goal, since its inception in 2003. The competition continued under Jardine Lloyd Thompson (JLT) as a sponsor. All matches were televised live on Fox Footy as well as on the AFL Live app.

Results

References

JLT Community Series
Australian Football League pre-season competition